Jack Farrell (3 January 1872 – 28 June 1953) was an Australian rules footballer who played with Collingwood in the Victorian Football League (VFL).

Notes

External links 

		
Jack Farrell's profile at Collingwood Forever

1872 births
1953 deaths
Australian rules footballers from Western Australia
Collingwood Football Club players